George Brodrick, 4th Viscount Midleton (1 November 1754 – 12 August 1836) was a British politician who sat in the House of Commons from 1774 to 1796, when he was raised to the peerage of Great Britain as Baron Brodrick.

Origins

Brodrick was the eldest son and heir of George Brodrick, 3rd Viscount Midleton (died 22 August 1765) and Albinia, the daughter of the Hon Thomas Townshend. The Brodricks were an English family that had settled in Ireland in the mid-17th century. He was educated at Eton College from 1766 to 1771, and was admitted to St. John's College, Cambridge in 1772.

He succeeded his father in 1765, inheriting his Irish Viscouncy and the Peper Harow estate in Surrey with its new but incomplete mansion, which he completed once he came of age. It is now a Grade I listed building.

Career
From 1774 to 1796 Midleton was able as an Irish peer to sit as one of the two MPs for Whitchurch, the seat being in the gift of his mother's brother, Thomas Townshend, 1st Viscount Sydney.

On 11 June 1796, Midleton was created Baron Brodrick of Peper Harrow, in the county of Surrey.

Midleton died at Peper Harrow (his principal ancestral estate in England) on 12 August 1836, and was buried at Wandsworth.

Family
Midleton married first (4 December 1778) Frances Pelham, the second daughter of Thomas Pelham, 1st Earl of Chichester by Anne, daughter of Frederick Meinhardt Frankland. By her, who died on 28 June 1783, he had a daughter, Frances Anne, who married Inigo Thomas. Midleton married secondly (13 June 1797) Maria Benyon, second daughter of Richard Benyon MP and his wife Hannah Hulse daughter of Sir Edward Hulse of Breamore House, Hampshire. Maria survived him, dying on 22 January 1852. They had six children, including:
George Alan Brodrick, 5th Viscount Midleton
Harriet Brodrick, who married her cousin, William John Brodrick, 7th Viscount Midleton.

References

1754 births
1836 deaths
Alumni of St John's College, Cambridge
British MPs 1774–1780
British MPs 1780–1784
British MPs 1784–1790
British MPs 1790–1796
British MPs 1796–1800
Members of the Parliament of Great Britain for English constituencies
People educated at Eton College
Viscounts in the Peerage of Ireland
Peers of Great Britain created by George III
Lord-Lieutenants of Surrey